Kernville (also, Whiskey Flat, Rogersville and Williamsburg) is a former settlement in the Kern River Valley of the Sierra Nevada, in Kern County, California.

Established in 1858 as a gold camp, the town was renamed Kernville in 1864. It lay at an elevation of 2,575 feet (785 m) near the present-day town of Wofford Heights.

Most of the town was dismantled or relocated to higher ground by the time it was fully submerged under the Lake Isabella reservoir in 1954. Some building foundations are visible when lake levels are low.

History
An 1858 gold rush, caused by the discovery of the Big Blue Mine nearby, led to the formation of a town on the flats along the Kern River.  Briefly called Rogersville (after the man who first found gold in the area while chasing his mule) and Williamsburg, it was renamed Whiskey Flat in 1863 after a saloon opened in the previously "dry" town. 
The post office formerly at Keysville was moved to Kernville and operated there from 1868 to 1951, when service was moved to the new Kernville.

Hollywood producers shot many films, mostly Westerns in the town.

The original townsite is now registered as California Historical Landmark #132.

See also

References

Destroyed towns
Former settlements in Kern County, California
Kern River Valley
History of Kern County, California
California Historical Landmarks
Submerged settlements in the United States
Populated places in the Sierra Nevada (United States)
Populated places established in 1858
Populated places disestablished in 1954
1858 establishments in California
1954 disestablishments in California